The 2022 Nevada Senate election was held on Tuesday, November 8, 2022. Voters in 11 districts of the Nevada Senate elected their senators. The elections coincided with the elections for other offices, including for U.S. Senate, U.S. House and the Nevada Assembly. Republicans needed to gain two seats to win control of the chamber. 

The primary elections were held on Tuesday, June 14, 2022.

Background 
In the 2020 Nevada State Senate election, Democrats maintained control of the Nevada Senate by a 12–9 margin. Democrats have controlled the chamber since 2016.

Predictions

Results

Overview

Summary of results by State Senate district
For districts not displayed, there is no election until 2024.

Close races
Seats where the margin of victory was under 10%:

Results by District

District 2

District 8

District 9

District 10

District 12

District 13

District 14

District 16

District 17

District 20

District 21

See also 
 2022 Nevada elections

Notes

References

State Senate
Nevada Senate
Nevada Senate elections